Alex White (born 3 December 1958) is an Irish lawyer and a former Labour Party politician. Since January 2023 he has been Director General of the Institute of International and European Affairs, a think-tank based in Dublin. White served as Minister for Communications, Energy and Natural Resources from 2014 to 2016, Minister of State for Primary Care from 2012 to 2014 and Leader of the Labour Party in the Seanad 2007 to 2011. He served as a Teachta Dála (TD) for the Dublin South constituency from 2011 to 2016. He was a Senator for the Cultural and Educational Panel from 2007 to 2011.

Early life
White grew up in Marino, Dublin. He was educated at Chanel College, Coolock, and later at Trinity College Dublin and King's Inns. He was called to the Bar in 1987.

White was a student activist in Trinity College, where he was president of the Students' Union and also for a time a supporter of various Trotskyist groupings, including the League for a Workers Republic. He was later a national officer of the Union of Students in Ireland. During his time as a producer with RTÉ, he was active in the SIPTU trade union. In common with Mary McAleese, he was attacked and criticised by a group led by Eoghan Harris and associated with the Workers' Party, over what they perceived as their bias towards Republican groups in the North. White was a strong opponent of Section 31 of the Broadcasting Act, which prevented Sinn Féin members from being heard. White has a long record of involvement in campaigns to further the equal rights of women. He actively campaigned for divorce in 1986 and 1995, and was a Director of Elections for the Anti-Amendment campaign on the North side of Dublin in 1983.

Political career
He was first elected to South Dublin County Council in 2004, for the Terenure-Rathfarnham local electoral area. He was an unsuccessful candidate at the 2007 general election in the Dublin South constituency.

White was nominated as a general election candidate in 2007, by the Labour Party leadership. He had voted for coalition with Fine Gael in a Labour Party congress (the line of Pat Rabbitte, then leader of the party). His election to the Seanad was due to a voting pact with Sinn Féin.

He was the Labour Party candidate in the 2009 by-election in Dublin South. He came second behind the former RTÉ economics editor George Lee. White was his party's Seanad group leader and Spokesperson on Children between 2007 and February 2011, when he was elected to the Dáil. He subsequently was appointed as Chairman of the Joint Oireachtas Committee on Finance, Public Expenditure and Reform.

White was leader of an Oireachtas delegation that met the Bundestag's Budgetary and European Affairs committees in Berlin in late January 2012.

White was formally nominated for the position of Minister of State for Primary Care by Eamon Gilmore on 27 September 2012, following the resignation of Róisín Shortall.

Following the resignation of Eamon Gilmore as Leader of the Labour Party, in the aftermath of Labour's poor result at the 2014 local and European elections, White announced his candidacy for the party leadership. On 4 July 2014, Joan Burton was elected as Labour Party leader, defeating White by 77% to 22%.

Alex White played a key role in the 2015 in the marriage equality referendum campaign.

On 11 July 2014, he was appointed Minister for Communications, Energy and Natural Resources.

White lost his seat at the 2016 general election. He remained Minister for Communications, Energy and Natural Resources during prolonged talks on government formation.

In June 2017, he was co-opted to fill a vacancy on Dún Laoghaire–Rathdown County Council.

In January 2019, White was selected as the Labour Party candidate for the Dublin constituency in the 2019 European Parliament election. He got 18,293 first-preference votes (5.0%) but was not elected.

White returned full-time to the Irish Bar in 2016 and continues to practise as a Senior Counsel. He was recently chair of the Employment Bar Association. Although retaining membership of the Labour Party he has not been politically active since 2019. In January 2023 he was appointed as Director General of the Institute of International and European Affairs.

References

External links

1958 births
Living people
Alumni of Trinity College Dublin
Irish barristers
Irish radio producers
Labour Party (Ireland) TDs
Local councillors in South Dublin (county)
Members of the 23rd Seanad
Members of the 31st Dáil
Ministers of State of the 31st Dáil
RTÉ people
Labour Party (Ireland) senators
Local councillors in Dún Laoghaire–Rathdown
Alumni of King's Inns
People from Coolock
People educated at Chanel College, Dublin